One by One is a British television series made by the BBC between 29 January 1984 and 2 May 1987.

The series, created by Anthony Read, followed the career of international veterinary surgeon David Taylor (called Donald Turner in the series) and his work caring for exotic animals at zoos in Britain, from the 1950s to the 1970s. Each series was set during a different decade, with exteriors filmed at Dudley Zoo, Chester Zoo and Knowsley Safari Park.

Thirty-two episodes were made over three series, transmitted on BBC1 in the early parts of 1984, 1985 & 1987. BBC1 repeated series 2 during the early months of 1986, as no new series had been made that year. The third series was also repeated on BBC1 over the Spring & Summer of 1988.

Cast

 Rob Heyland – Donald Turner
 James Ellis – Paddy Reilly
 Sonia Graham – Ethel Leadbetter
 Peter Jeffrey – Maurice Webb (Series 1–2)
 Heather James – Maggie Raymond (Series 1–2)
 Liz Smith – Gran Turner (Series 1)
 Garfield Morgan – Howard Rundle (Series 1)
 Rosie Kerslake – Jenny Blount (Series 1)
 Jack Hedley – Peter Raymond (Series 1)
 Peter Gilmore – Ben Bishop (Series 2)
 Catherine Schell – Lady Ann Pendle (Series 2)
 Andrew Robertson – Jock Drummond (Series 3)
 Christina Nagy – Liz Collier (Series 3)
 Tenniel Evans – Teddy Haslam (Series 3)
 Clifford Rose – Challon (Series 1 and 3)

Series overview

Episodes

Series 1

Series 2

Series 3

External links

1984 British television series debuts
1987 British television series endings
1980s British drama television series
BBC television dramas
English-language television shows
Period television series
Television series about animals
Television series set in the 1950s
Television series set in the 1960s
Television series set in the 1970s
Veterinary medicine in the United Kingdom